Khakhara or Khkhra is a village in Sahabganj, Chandauli, Uttar Pradesh, India. The first gram ("village") pradhan of the village is Shri Lalji Singh. Paddy and wheat are the main crops grown there.

References
  

Villages in Chandauli district